Matas is a name. Notable people with the name include:

Surname
 Carol Matas (born 1949), Canadian children's writer
 David Matas (born 1943), Canadian legal counsel and human rights activist
 Jaume Matas (born 1954), Spanish politician; President of the Balearic Islands
 Mike Matas (born 1986), American user interface designer and icon artist
 Niccolò Matas (1798–1872), Italian architect
 Nikola Matas (born 1987), Croatian football defender
 Risto Mätas (born 1984), Estonian javelin thrower
 Rudolph Matas (1860-1957), American surgeon

Given name
 Matas Macaitis (born 1988), Lithuanian artistic gymnast
 Matas Maldeikis (born 1980), Lithuanian politician
 Matas Metlevski (born 2003), Lithuanian actor
 Matas Šalčius (1890–1940), Lithuanian traveler, journalist, writer, and political figure

See also
 Matthew (name)
 Mata (disambiguation)

Lithuanian masculine given names